"Blitzgiving" is the tenth episode of the sixth season of the CBS sitcom How I Met Your Mother, and the 122nd episode overall. It aired on November 22, 2010.

Plot

It is the day before Thanksgiving, and Ted is hosting his first Thanksgiving for the group, and tries his best to make it memorable. He makes a special turkey by stuffing it with a smaller turkey, calling it a "turturkeykey". Just as he is about to call it an early night, Marshall and the group tell him not to leave the bar, or he will get the curse of "The Blitz". Future Ted explains how an old college friend, Steve Henry (Jorge Garcia), had the curse of The Blitz; whenever he would leave the room with a group, something amazing would happen.

The next morning, Ted awakens to find his apartment a wreck. The gang are all present with Steve, and Ted discovers Zoey sleeping in the bathtub. Lily explains that Zoey entered MacLaren's after Ted left and, while the group originally schemed to get back at her, they ended up having a great night with her and Steve. Ted realizes he truly has been cursed with The Blitz.

As a result of the group's actions the previous night, Ted's oven is broken and the gang seek a place where they could cook the turkey. Lily remembers that Zoey invited them all to her place for Thanksgiving, as her husband is spending Thanksgiving with his daughter. Barney hitches a separate cab to Zoey's but then realizes he may have been cursed with The Blitz by being away from the group. Barney meets the group outside Zoey's apartment and he realizes that he has become The Blitz, as the group had earlier run into a Thanksgiving Day parade.

At Zoey's apartment, Lily tries to convince Ted that enemies can become friends but Zoey and Ted start fighting, during which he compares her to an evil stepmother, which makes her so angry that she orders them to leave. While heading back Ted realises that the reason his insult upset Zoey so much was because she is hurt by the fact that her stepdaughter avoids spending time with her on the holidays. Ted and the group head back to the apartment and Ted asks for Zoey's forgiveness, saying that he understands her feelings for her stepdaughter. As the group enjoys a Thanksgiving meal, Future Ted says it is how he and Zoey finally became friends, also stating that the 'turturkeykey' tasted "wrong".

After dinner, Barney and Steve head towards the elevator. Steve remembers that he forgot his jacket and turns to retrieve it. Just then, a girl from the neighboring apartment darts into the elevator, with Barney inside. As the door closes, her dress gets stuck between the doors and rips apart. Steve realizes that he has been "Blitzed" again.

Critical response 

Reviews for the episode were positive.

Donna Bowman of the A.V. Club graded the episode at A−, praising the story development and the various ideas put in that actually worked together. She also noted Garcia's appearance as a continuance of his story after the Lost finale and Barney's desperation not to miss out on various events.

Angel Cohn of Television Without Pity also put the episode at A−, saying the writers did well to insert Lost references and help Garcia discover more comedic skills.

Robert Canning of IGN gave the episode a rating of 8 out of 10.

Chris O'Hara of TVFanatic.com gave the episode a rating of 2.8 out of 5.

References

External links 
 

How I Met Your Mother (season 6) episodes
2010 American television episodes
Thanksgiving television episodes